Rekeil Leshaun Pyke (born 1 September 1997) is an English professional footballer who plays as a forward for  club Shrewsbury Town.

A product of the Academy at Huddersfield Town, he was loaned out to Wrexham in November 2016, Colchester United in January 2017, and Port Vale in July 2017. He returned to Wrexham on loan for the first half of the 2018–19 season, before moving on loan to Rochdale for the second half of the campaign. He returned on loan to Rochdale for the first half of the 2019–20 season, before he was released by Huddersfield in July 2020. He signed with Shrewsbury Town the following month and was loaned out to Scunthorpe United in January 2022.

Career

Huddersfield Town
Born in Leeds, Pyke is a product of the Huddersfield Town Academy. He first joined the club at under-12 level from local junior side Rothwell Juniors. He signed his first professional contract in February 2015, having already represented the under-21 team at the age of 17. He joined National League side Wrexham on a month long loan in November 2016. He made his debut on 29 November in Wrexham's 1–0 defeat at Lincoln City. "Dragons" manager Dean Keates said Pyke "did okay... the physicality was all new to him, a new environment, but there is still a lot more to come from him". After three appearances at the Racecourse Ground, Pyke returned to Huddersfield at the end of his loan spell on 28 December. On 30 January 2017, Pyke joined League Two club Colchester United on loan until the end of the 2016–17 season. He came on as a second-half substitute for Owen Garvan to make his professional debut on 15 February during Colchester's 3–2 defeat to Crawley Town at the Colchester Community Stadium. He made his first start in a 2–0 home victory over Mansfield Town on 14 March, after which "U's" manager John McGreal said he was "delighted" with Pyke, describing him as a "beast of a kid". He failed to score in four league starts and eight substitute appearances for Colchester.

On 11 July 2017, Pyke joined League Two side Port Vale on loan for the entire 2017–18 season. Manager Michael Brown warned fans not to burden the teenager with too much expectation after Pyke scored four goals in his first two pre-season friendly matches. However he struggled to even appear on the first-team bench, and speaking in October, new manager Neil Aspin blamed league rules that prevented him from naming more than five loanees in a matchday squad. He then picked up a hamstring injury in a reserve team game and returned to the Kirklees Stadium for treatment. He was recalled to Huddersfield permanently on 2 January 2018.

On 10 July 2018, he returned to Wrexham on a season-long loan for the 2018–19 season. He signed a new contract at Huddersfield to keep tied to the club until summer 2020. He scored five goals in 27 appearances during his loan spell at Wrexham, being absent from Graham Barrow's first-team only during a six-week spell at Christmas when he was in recovery from a hamstring injury. On 26 January, he was named in the National League team of the day for his man of the match performance in a 1–0 win over Maidenhead United. However he was recalled to Huddersfield four days later; Welsh newspaper The Leader reported that "Pyke's departure is a big blow in Wrexham's push for a top-seven finish".

On 30 January 2019, he moved up two divisions from Wrexham to join struggling League One side Rochdale on loan until the end of the 2018–19 season. He made three starts and three substitute appearances for the "Dale" by the end of the 2018–19 campaign. On 3 July, he rejoined Rochdale on loan for the whole of the 2019–20 season, with manager Brian Barry-Murphy feeling that his "unique... skills and qualities... [added] a different dimension to our attacking play". Having scored three goals in 20 appearances at Spotland, he was recalled by new Huddersfield manager Danny Cowley on 5 January. Cowley said that with Pyke's contract due to expire in the summer he wanted to assess the player at Huddersfield. He made his Huddersfield debut as a late substitute in a 3–2 defeat at Fulham on 1 February. However this was to prove his only appearance for the "Terriers" before he was released on 24 July 2020.

Shrewsbury Town
On 3 August 2020, Pyke joined League One side Shrewsbury Town, signing a three-year deal and reuniting with boss Sam Ricketts who Pyke had played under at Wrexham. He scored on his "Shrews" debut, a 4–3 defeat at Middlesbrough in the EFL Cup. However later in September Pyke was ruled out for four months due to a thigh injury after being forced off in a 2–1 defeat to Northampton Town at the New Meadow. Ricketts commented that Pyke and injured strike partner Leon Clarke were both a big miss for the team. By the time he returned to fitness Steve Cotterill had replaced Ricketts as manager, and assistant boss Aaron Wilbraham said that Pyke would have to work hard to win back his place in the starting eleven. He ended the 2020–21 campaign with 14 appearances to his name, without scoring any further goals.

On 31 January 2022, Pyke joined League Two bottom side Scunthorpe United on loan until the end of the 2021–22 season. He had previously worked with manager Keith Hill at Rochdale. He started six games and made four substitute appearances as the "Iron" were relegated out of the English Football League.

Style of play
Port Vale assistant manager Chris Morgan said that Pyke was "quick and powerful" and had good finishing skills.

Career statistics

References

1997 births
Living people
Footballers from Leeds
Black British sportspeople
English footballers
Association football forwards
Huddersfield Town A.F.C. players
Wrexham A.F.C. players
Colchester United F.C. players
Port Vale F.C. players
Rochdale A.F.C. players
Shrewsbury Town F.C. players
Scunthorpe United F.C. players
National League (English football) players
English Football League players